Glaucon (c. 445 BC – 4th century BC), son of Ariston, was an ancient Athenian and Plato's older brother. He is primarily known as a major conversant with Socrates in the Republic. He is also referenced briefly in the beginnings of two dialogues of Plato, the Parmenides and Symposium. Glaucon also appears in Xenophon's Memorabilia, and is referenced in Aristotle's Poetics, where Aristotle states: "The true mode of interpretation is the precise opposite of what Glaucon mentions. Critics, he says, jump at certain groundless conclusions; they pass adverse judgement and then proceed to reason on it; and, assuming that the poet has said whatever they happen to think, find fault if a thing is inconsistent with their own fancy."

See also
List of speakers in Plato's dialogues

Notes

External links

5th-century BC Athenians
Pupils of Socrates
4th-century BC deaths
440s BC births
Family of Plato